Gympie Airport  is located approximately  south of the town centre. The airport serves as a small regional airport serving the local area.

See also
 List of airports in Queensland

References

External links
Photos taken at Gympie Airport

Airports in Queensland